Robert Kemsley (Robin) Orr  (2 June 1909 – 9 April 2006) was a Scottish organist and composer.

Life
Born in Brechin, and educated at Loretto School, he studied the organ at the Royal College of Music in London under Walter Galpin Alcock, and piano with Arthur Benjamin.<ref name=grove>[https://www.oxfordmusiconline.com/grovemusic/view/10.1093/gmo/9781561592630.001.0001/omo-9781561592630-e-0000020498?rskey=cV0CQD Griffiths, Paul. 'Orr, Robin [Robert] (Kemsley)' in Grove Music Online]</ref> He then continued his studies at Pembroke College, Cambridge under Cyril Rootham. Following studies with Alfredo Casella and Nadia Boulanger in Paris he returned to Cambridge in 1938 as Organist of St John's College, succeeding Rootham. During his war service in the Royal Air Force Herbert Howells deputised for him.

After World War II he became a lecturer at Cambridge and a professor at the Royal College of Music, then Gardiner Professor of Music at Glasgow University from 1956 to 1965. While in Glasgow he worked with Alexander Gibson to set up the Musica Viva contemporary music festival, promoting the work of (among others) Stockhausen, Schoenberg, Stravinsky, Iain Hamilton, Thea Musgrave, and Orr himself. Gibson also asked Orr to help him form Scottish Opera in 1960, and Orr served as the founding chairman between 1962 and 1976.

He returned to Cambridge in 1965 as Professor of Music, a post he held until his retirement in 1976 (later Emeritus). He was made a CBE in 1972. Robin Orr married Margaret Mace, the daughter of Egyptologist Arthur Cruttenden Mace, in December 1937. They had three children. In 1979 they divorced and Orr married again, to Doris Winny-Meyer. An "entertaining if somewhat personally reticent" autobiography, Musical Chairs, was published in 1999.WorldCat

He was not related to Buxton Orr (1924-1997) - also a Scottish composer.

Music
The overture The Prospect of Whitby (after the London pub) attracted some attention in 1948. But it was the Symphony in One Movement (1960–63), first championed by Norman Del Mar and the BBC Scottish Orchestra, but soon taken up and recorded by the Royal Scottish National Orchestra under Alexander Gibson, that put Orr on the map as a composer. Gibson subsequently conducted the work at the BBC Proms in 1966. There were two further symphonies (1970 and 1978), both also one movement works.  He wrote three operas: the "pithy, socially perceptive" Full Circle (commissioned by Scottish Television for Scottish Opera in 1968), the "tense and powerful" Hermiston (Edinburgh Festival 1975) and the "witty, artful comic opera" On the Razzle (1988), based on Tom Stoppard's play.Cole, Hugo. 'Orr, Robin' in Grove Music Online (Opera) And Orr also made a substantial contribution to Anglican church music, much of it written for St John's College. Notable is the anthem Come and let yourselves be built (1961).Music and Letters, Volume 45 No 1, January 1964, p 90–91

A CD of his orchestral music, including the Italian Overture (1952), From the Book of Philip Sparrow for soprano and strings setting John Skelton (1969), Rhapsody for string orchestra (1958) and Journeys and Places for soprano and orchestra setting Edwin Muir (1971) was issued in 2000 to mark the composer's 90th birthday.Kemp, Ian. 'Robin Orr at 90: Age of Gold' in Musical Times No 1866, Spring 1999, p 11-17 A further CD of his chamber music, including Max Rostal's historic 1948 recording of the Sonatina for Violin and Piano (1941), as well as other archive recordings of the Violin Sonata (1947), Serenade for String Trio (1948, rev. 1989) and Duo for Violin and Cello in one movement (1953, rev. 1965), was issued for the centenary in 2009. The chamber music shows a growing maturity of compositional technique and intensity of feeling, especially after the war (for instance in the slow dolente movement of the 1947 Violin Sonata). The Serenade shows the growing influence on Central European expressionism on his music. The Duo for violin and cello is so dense it sometimes sounds almost like a string quartet.

The Sinfonietta Helvetica'' (1990) was his final orchestral work. It written in Switzerland, where he had a second home near Klosters, to mark the 700th anniversary of the Swiss confederation. It was first performed at the Glasgow Royal Concert Hall on 6 December 1991 by the BBC Scottish Symphony Orchestra, conducted by Feodor Glushchenko.

References

External links
 Symphony in One Movement. Royal Scottish National Orchestra, Alexander Gibson (Conductor)

1909 births
2006 deaths
Scottish classical composers
British male classical composers
Scottish opera composers
Male opera composers
Alumni of Pembroke College, Cambridge
English classical organists
British male organists
Fellows of St John's College, Cambridge
Academics of the University of Glasgow
Commanders of the Order of the British Empire
Alumni of the Royal College of Music
People from Brechin
Honorary Members of the Royal Academy of Music
People educated at Loretto School, Musselburgh
Scottish Renaissance
20th-century organists
20th-century British male musicians
20th-century British musicians
Professors of Music (Cambridge)
Male classical organists
20th-century musicologists